Francesco Puppi (born 26 January 1992) is an Italian male mountain runner and sky runner, world champion at 2017 World Long Distance Mountain Running Championships.

Biography
The 2017 World Long Distance Mountain Running Championships was rewritten and the gold medal was dropped by Eritrean Petro Mamu, disqualified for doping, and was assigned to the Italian Francesco Puppi.

Achievements

National titles
Italian Vertical Kilometer Championships
Vertical kilometer: 2015

See also
 Italy at the European Mountain Running Championships
 Italy at the World Mountain Running Championships

References

External links
 
 
 Francesco Puppi profile at FIDAL 

1992 births
Living people
Italian male mountain runners
Italian male long-distance runners
Italian sky runners
Sportspeople from Como
World Long Distance Mountain Running Championships winners
21st-century Italian people